Marcel Bodenmann (born ) is a Swiss wheelchair curler.

He participated in the 2018 Winter Paralympics where Swiss team finished on sixth place.

Teams

Mixed doubles

References

External links 

Marcel Bodenmann - Swiss Paralympic
Marcel BODENMANN - Athlete Profile - World Para Nordic Skiing - Live results | International Paralympic Committee

 Video: 

Living people
1966 births
Swiss male curlers
Swiss wheelchair curlers
Paralympic wheelchair curlers of Switzerland
Wheelchair curlers at the 2018 Winter Paralympics
Swiss wheelchair curling champions